Naigala Grama Niladhari Division is a Grama Niladhari Division of the Rajanganaya Divisional Secretariat of Anuradhapura District of North Central Province, Sri Lanka. It has Grama Niladhari Division Code 443.

Naigala is a surrounded by the Track 3, Maha Thimbirikalla, Thissapura, Serasumgala and Thimbiripokuna Grama Niladhari Divisions.

Demographics

Ethnicity 
The Naigala Grama Niladhari Division has a Sinhalese majority (100.0%). In comparison, the Rajanganaya Divisional Secretariat (which contains the Naigala Grama Niladhari Division) has a Sinhalese majority (99.9%)

Religion 
The Naigala Grama Niladhari Division has a Buddhist majority (98.7%). In comparison, the Rajanganaya Divisional Secretariat (which contains the Naigala Grama Niladhari Division) has a Buddhist majority (98.4%)

References 

Grama Niladhari Divisions of Rajanganaya Divisional Secretariat